"Mujhe Gale Se Laga Lo" is a song written by Sahir Ludhianvi and composed by Ravi for the 1963 film Aaj Aur Kal. It was released on 31 December in 1963 by Saregama. Initially the song was performed by Mohammed Rafi and Asha Bhosle, on-screen lisping was sung by Nanda and Sunil Dutt.

In populer culture
In 2007, the song used in the Bangladeshi documentary film Swapnabhumi directed by Tanvir Mokammel. Where the song was sung by Kamal Ahmed with music by Syed Shabab Ali Arzoo.

References

External links
 Mujhe Gale Se Laga Lo at Saregama

1963 songs
Indian songs
Hindi songs
Hindi film songs